Jorge Hugo Fernández (born 24 February 1942) is an Argentine former footballer. He played in four matches for the Argentina national football team from 1963 to 1967. He was also part of Argentina's squad for the 1963 South American Championship.

References

External links
 

1942 births
Living people
Argentine footballers
Argentina international footballers
Place of birth missing (living people)
Association football forwards
Club Atlético Atlanta footballers
Boca Juniors footballers
Atlético Nacional footballers
Argentine expatriate footballers
Expatriate footballers in Colombia